Hoseynabad-e Kushk Zar (also Romanized as Ḩoseynābād-e Kūshk Zar and Ḩoseynābād-e Kūshkeh Zar) is a village in Saidabad Rural District, in the Central District of Savojbolagh County, Alborz Province, Iran. At the 2006 census, its population was 174, in 45 families.

References 

Populated places in Savojbolagh County